Robert Island or Mitchells Island or Polotsk Island or Roberts Island is an island  long and  wide, situated between Nelson Island and Greenwich Island in the South Shetland Islands, Antarctica. Surface area . The name "Robert Island" dates back to around 1821 and is now established in international usage.

Much of the Coppermine Peninsula in the west of the island is made up by a perched strandflat surface that was in past at sea level.

Captain Richard Fildes may have named Robert Island for his brig . Fildes was sealing in the South Shetlands in 1821–1822 until ice destroyed his vessel in March 1822. Fildes Strait is named for him.

See also 
 List of lighthouses in Antarctica
 Clothier Harbor
 Composite Antarctic Gazetteer
 List of Antarctic and sub-Antarctic islands
 List of Antarctic islands south of 60° S
 SCAR
 Territorial claims in Antarctica

Maps
 Chart of South Shetland including Coronation Island, &c. from the exploration of the sloop Dove in the years 1821 and 1822 by George Powell Commander of the same. Scale ca. 1:200000. London: Laurie, 1822.
 South Shetland Islands. Scale 1:200000 topographic map. DOS 610 Sheet W 62 58. Tolworth, UK, 1968.
 L.L. Ivanov et al. Antarctica: Livingston Island and Greenwich Island, South Shetland Islands. Scale 1:100000 topographic map. Sofia: Antarctic Place-names Commission of Bulgaria, 2005.
 L.L. Ivanov. Antarctica: Livingston Island and Greenwich, Robert, Snow and Smith Islands. Scale 1:120000 topographic map.  Troyan: Manfred Wörner Foundation, 2009.  
 Antarctic Digital Database (ADD). Scale 1:250000 topographic map of Antarctica.  Scientific Committee on Antarctic Research (SCAR), 1993–2016.

References

External links

 
Islands of Robert Island
Lighthouses in Antarctica